The Pariwhakaoho River is a river of the Tasman Region of New Zealand's South Island. It flows northeast  from sources within Kahurangi National Park to reach Golden Bay 10 kilometres northwest of Tākaka.

See also
List of rivers of New Zealand

References

Rivers of the Tasman District
Kahurangi National Park
Rivers of New Zealand